is a station in southeast Tokyo, Japan. It is the only station on the Oimachi Line with two tracks in each direction, being used for transfer between local and express trains.

Station layout

The Tokyu Oimachi Line platforms are scheduled to be lengthened to handle seven-car trains on express services during fiscal 2017.

History

July 6, 1927: Higashi-Senzoku Station (東洗足駅) of Meguro-Kamata Electric Railway opened.
August 1927: Hatagaoka Station (旗ヶ岡駅) of Ikegami Electric Railway opened.
March 1951: Higashi-Senzoku Station was renamed Hatanodai and rebuilt on the present position on the Oimachi Line.
May 1951: Hatagaoka Station merged with Hatanodai Station and rebuilt on the present position on the Ikegami Line.

Surrounding area 
Showa University (Hatanodai Campus) and the university hospital

See also
 List of railway stations in Japan

References

External links  

  

Railway stations in Tokyo
Railway stations in Japan opened in 1927
Tokyu Oimachi Line
Tokyu Ikegami Line
Stations of Tokyu Corporation